Guillaume Walter Brenner (born 10 February 1986) is a former professional footballer who played as a midfielder. Born in France, he represented Togo at international level.

Club career
Brenner was born in Beauvais, France. He began his career with US Chantilly and joined the academy of FC Nantes one year later, playing there in the youth teams for four years. Additionally, he played one game for the reserve team and signed in July 2005 with CS Louhans-Cuiseaux. Brenner played 11 games for Louhans-Cuiseaux in the Championnat National. He signed a contract in January 2008 with Polish Second League club Czarni Żagań. After one year in Poland, Brenner went back to France in December 2008 and signed for Olympique Noisy-le-Sec in the Championnat de France amateur. He left the club after a half year, in summer 2009, to join Cypriot club Alki Larnaca of the Cypriot First Division.

International career
The Quadroon French-born player debuted for the Togo national team in 2006; he holds current seven international caps.

References

External links
 

1986 births
Living people
Sportspeople from Beauvais
Footballers from Hauts-de-France
French sportspeople of Togolese descent
Citizens of Togo through descent
Togolese footballers
French footballers
Association football midfielders
FC Nantes players
Louhans-Cuiseaux FC players
Alki Larnaca FC players
Olympique Noisy-le-Sec players
Championnat National players
Cypriot First Division players
Cypriot Second Division players
Togo international footballers
Togolese expatriate footballers
French expatriate footballers
Togolese expatriate sportspeople in Poland
French expatriate sportspeople in Poland
Expatriate footballers in Poland
Togolese expatriate sportspeople in Cyprus
French expatriate sportspeople in Cyprus
Expatriate footballers in Cyprus